The 1977 NAPA National 500 was a NASCAR Winston Cup Series racing event that was held on October 9, 1977, at Charlotte Motor Speedway in Concord, North Carolina.

Race report
41 drivers competed at this event. Benny Parsons defeated Cale Yarborough by 19.2 seconds in front of 79,400 spectators. Parsons scored a dominant Winston Cup victory, in terms of percentage of laps led. There were 18 lead changes and four cautions; the race lasted three hours and thirty minutes. Bruce Hill received the last-place finish due to engine problems on lap 15 of this 334-lap race. By all evidence, this would be the last win for a Chevrolet Laguna in NASCAR Cup Series history.

His next pole position would come at the 1978 World 600 where he would get his 10th consecutive pole position start at Charlotte Motor Speedway. Pearson's final pole position at Charlotte Motor Speedway would come at the 1978 NAPA National 500 - setting a record. Other notable drivers at this event included: Bill Elliott, Janet Guthrie, Neil Bonnett, A. J. Foyt, Dick Brooks, Darrell Waltrip, and Buddy Baker. Tom Sneva would make his NASCAR debut at this racing event. Dale Earnhardt would start his only race in 1977 driving for Henley Gray.

Individual earnings for each driver ranged from the winner's share of $41,075 ($ when adjusted for inflation) to the last-place finisher's share of $820 ($ when adjusted for inflation). The total prize purse for this event was $223,530 ($ when adjusted for inflation).

Qualifying

Finishing order
Section reference: 

 Benny Parsons†
 Cale Yarborough
 David Pearson†
 Buddy Baker†
 Darrell Waltrip
 Dick Brooks†
 A.J. Foyt
 Neil Bonnett†
 Janet Guthrie
 Bill Elliott
 Ron Hutcherson
 Coo Coo Marlin†
 Dick May†
 James Hylton†
 J.D. McDuffie†
 Richard Childress
 Buddy Arrington†
 G.C. Spencer†
 D.K. Ulrich
 Peter Knab
 Tommy Gale†
 Ed Negre†
 Dave Marcis*
 Ricky Rudd
 Tighe Scott*
 Bobby Allison*
 Tom Sneva*
 Jimmy Means*
 Dick Trickle*
 Lennie Pond*
 Butch Hartman*†
 Richard Petty*
 Frank Warren*
 Sam Sommers*
 Skip Manning*
 Donnie Allison*
 Cecil Gordon*†
 Dale Earnhardt*†
 Roland Wlodyka*
 Jim Raptis*
 Bruce Hill*†

* Driver failed to finish race 
† signifies that the driver is known to be deceased

Standings after the race

References

NAPA National 500
NAPA National 500
NASCAR races at Charlotte Motor Speedway